Many vessels have been named Triton or Tryton, after Triton, the son of Poseidon and Amphitrite, and the personification of the roaring waters:

 , a Danish Navy frigate
 , several Royal Navy vessels
 British T-class submarine, also known as the Triton class, diesel-electric submarines
 , several U.S. Coast Guard vessels
 , several U.S. Navy vessels
 , a trimaran vessel used by the Australians Custom Service, and formerly by the Royal Navy
 , a cruise ship named Triton from 1991 to 2004
 , a vessel that operated on Lake Washington in the first part of the 20th century
 , a sloop manufactured in Sydney, Australia, throughout the 1980s
 , an American 1958 sailboat design
 ; four vessels bearing the name Triton have sailed for the British East India Company.
  was launched at Calcutta and sold shortly thereafter to Spanish owners. She was sailing from Bengal to Cadiz when an American-built and outfitted privateer with a letter of marque from the patriotic forces in Buenos Aires captured her in January 1817.